Sönmez is a Turkish unisex given name and surname. It may refer to:

 Benyamin Sönmez, Turkish classical musician
 Burhan Sönmez, Turkish writer
 Doğukan Sönmez, Turkish basketball player
 Fikri Sönmez, Turkish politician
 Hasan Sönmez, Turkish footballer
 Mahmut Sönmez, Turkish-Dutch footballer
 Necmi Sönmez,  Turkish-German curator
 Şebnem Sönmez, Turkish actress

Turkish unisex given names
Turkish-language surnames